That's What I Heard is a studio album by American musician, Robert Cray. It was released on February 28, 2020 under Nozzle Records.

Critical reception
"That's What I Heard " was met with widespread critical acclaim. At Metacritic, which assigns a weighted average rating out of 100 to reviews from mainstream publications, this release received an average score of 83, based on 6 reviews. Reviewing in his Substack-published "Consumer Guide" column, Robert Christgau highlighted the songs "This Man", "Burying Ground", and "My Baby Likes to Boogalo", while writing in summary of the album: "At 66, one of the sharpest songwriters ever to identify bluesman identifies the abuser in the house and invents a dance called the FBI". Mark Deming of AllMusic wrote in his review: "At a time when deep Southern soul isn't doing a whole lot better than the blues in the marketplace, Robert Cray is an effective cheerleader for both forms."

Awards
That's What I Heard received the Soul Blues Album award at the 2021 Blues Music Award.

Track listing

Charts

References

2020 albums
Robert Cray albums